Shelagh O'Brien is a Canadian television director. She is most noted as a three-time Canadian Screen Award winner, receiving awards for Best Direction, Variety or Sketch Comedy at the 4th Canadian Screen Awards in 2016 for the opening ceremony of the 2015 Pan American Games, for Best Direction, Lifestyle or Information at the 8th Canadian Screen Awards in 2020 for her direction of the 2019 Giller Prize gala broadcast, and Best Direction, Reality/Competition at the 9th Canadian Screen Awards for the Canada's Drag Race episode "U Wear It Well".

She is also a frequent director of Crave's television comedy specials from the Just for Laughs festival.

References

External links

Canadian television directors
Canadian women television directors
Canadian Screen Award winners
Living people
Year of birth missing (living people)